Standing Sushi Bar is a Japanese-food restaurant chain in Singapore and Indonesia.  It was started in August 2009 with its first outlet in Raffles Place. The company was founded by Howard Lo.

Standing Sushi Bar presently has 3 outlets.  The restaurant at 8Q SAM opened in September 2010, Marina Bay Link Mall opened in November 2010, and the first branch in Indonesia opened at La Piazza, Jakarta on January 15, 2012.  The original Raffles Place branch closed in April 2011.

The restaurant has been cited for its novel use of social media, and it was one of the first in Singapore to offer Foursquare promotions.

Accolades
In March 2010, Standing Sushi Bar was voted #1 sushi in Singapore by the Hungrygowhere community.

In popular culture
In April 2011, Standing Sushi Bar created sushi rolls based on two of the most-talked about candidates (Nicole Seah and Tin Pei Ling) during Singapore's general election.

See also
 List of sushi restaurants

References

External links

Company blog

Restaurants established in 2009
Fast-food chains of Singapore
Restaurant chains in Singapore
Japanese restaurants
Sushi restaurants
Singaporean brands